Thayyil Radhakrishnan (Death : 11 August 2014) was a Malayalam Novelist.

Biography 
Radhakrishnan was born to Adv.Sankarankutty Menon and Vilasini at Kunnamkulam, Thrissur district, Kerala, India. He completed his B.Sc course from Sree Kerala Varma College and did medical courses in Patna. Mangalore and Mumbai. His first Novel, Sheen won the Tagore award.

Books 
 Sheen
 Pataliputhram
 Nizhalukal Samsarikkunna Ayodhya
 Netravathi

Award
 Tagore award

References

External links

 നേത്രാവതി തയ്യില്‍ രാധാകൃഷ്ണന്‍

2014 deaths
People from Thrissur district
Malayalam novelists
Novelists from Kerala
21st-century Indian novelists